Rifael Ronald (Riff) Markowitz (born 1938) is a Canadian-American television and theatre producer, most recently the managing director, MC and co-founder of The Fabulous Palm Springs Follies, which performed at the historic Plaza Theatre in downtown Palm Springs, California until 2014.

Biography
Markowitz was born in New York City but grew up in Toronto, Ontario, Canada.

He ran away from home at the age of 15, worked as a clown for a year, then secured a job as a radio announcer on CJKL in Kirkland Lake, Ontario. He later moved into television with CHCH-TV in Hamilton, producing several of the station's early forays into television syndication, including The Randy Dandy Show, The Hilarious House of Frightenstein, and Party Game.

He was also a television personality, both as the titular Randy Dandy in The Randy Dandy Show and as announcer "Gardiner Westbound" on Party Game.

He was also a producer on The Wolfman Jack Show, creator and executive producer of the HBO TV series The Hitchhiker, and a cofounder of the early Canadian pay television movie channel First Choice.

He moved to Palm Springs in 1991 intending to retire, but his continuing interest in theatre led to the offer to restore a vaudeville theatre, which became home to The Fabulous Palm Springs Follies.

References

External links

Living people
1938 births
American theatre directors
Television producers from California
American television directors
American television writers
American clowns
Canadian theatre directors
Canadian television producers
Canadian television directors
Canadian television writers
Canadian television personalities
Canadian clowns
Writers from New York City
Writers from Palm Springs, California
Writers from Toronto
Screenwriters from New York (state)
Screenwriters from California